= Graffiti in Boston =

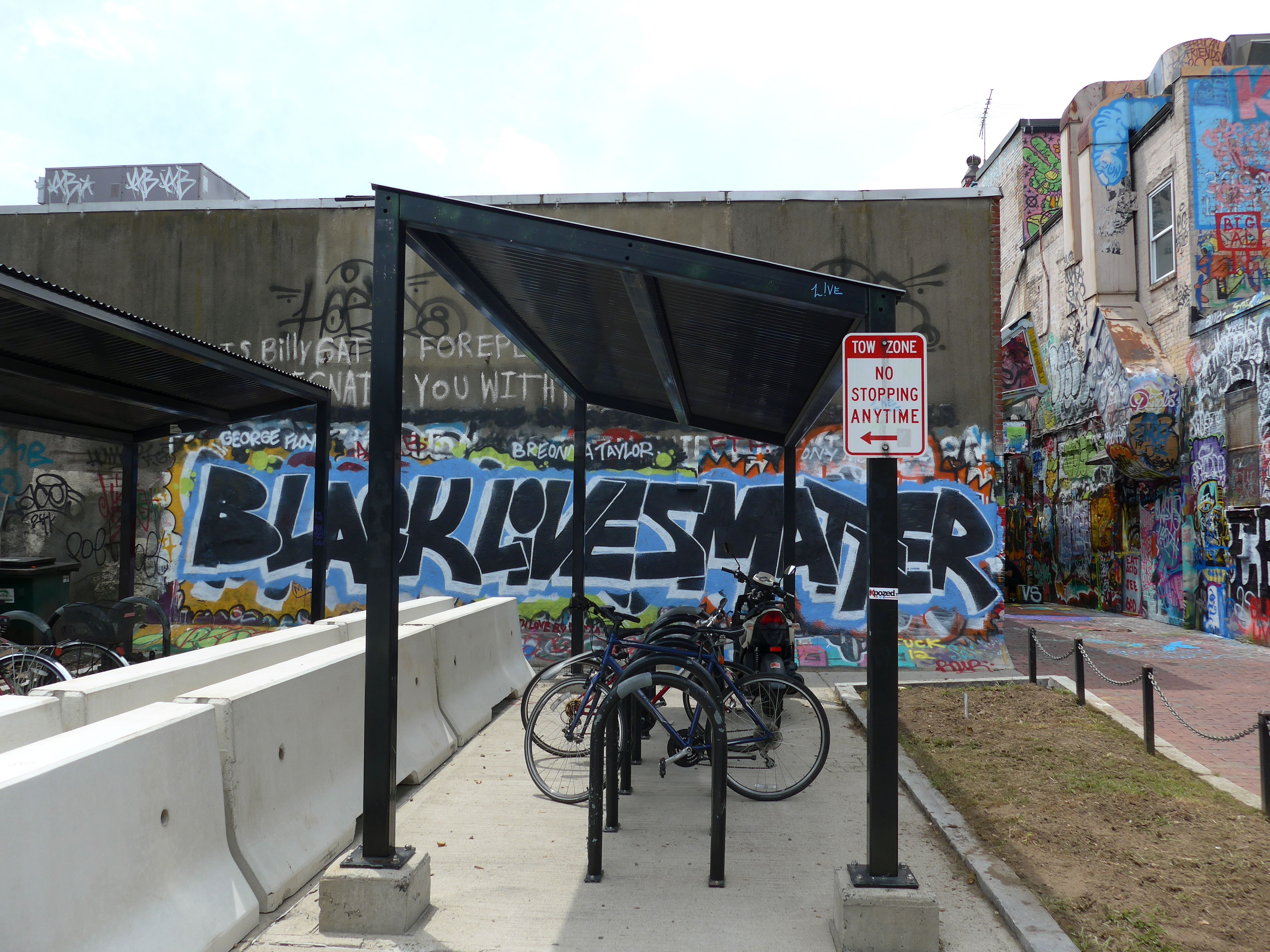
Graffiti in Boston

Graffiti is a cause of disagreement among residents of Boston, in the U.S. state of Massachusetts.
